Son of the Sea (Swedish: Havets son) is a 1949 Swedish drama film directed by Rolf Husberg and starring Per Oscarsson, Dagny Lind and  John Elfström. It was shot at the Centrumateljéerna Studios in Stockholm. The film's sets were designed by the art director P.A. Lundgren.

Cast
 Per Oscarsson as Rolf Bakken
 Dagny Lind as Sigrid Bakken
 John Elfström as Jockum
 Barbro Nordin as 	Solveig Moen
 Willie Sjöberg as 	Harald Björhus
 Axel Högel as 	Hagen, priest
 Ingrid Thulin as 	Gudrun
 Christian Bratt as Tove Ericsen
 Nils Hallberg as 	Håkan Haraldsen
 Albin Erlandzon as Kåre
 Svea Holst as Inga Björhus
 Karin Högel as 	Brita Hagen 
 Magnus Kesster as	Sten
 Gunnar Lundin as 	Gunnar Björhus 
 Eric Malmberg as Nielsen
 Wilma Malmlöf as Gammel-Kerstin 
 Aurore Palmgren as 	Mrs. Hansen 
 Georg Skarstedt as 	Lukas, 'Tröj' 
 Birger Åsander as 	Per Haraldsen
 Brita Öberg as 	Waitress at Hotel Lofoten 
 Eric Laurent as Priest in Svolvær

References

Bibliography 
 Qvist, Per Olov & von Bagh, Peter. Guide to the Cinema of Sweden and Finland. Greenwood Publishing Group, 2000.

External links 
 

1949 films
Swedish drama films
1949 drama films
1940s Swedish-language films
Films directed by Rolf Husberg
Swedish black-and-white films
1940s Swedish films